Ninety Degrees in the Shade is a 1965 British-Czech drama film directed by Jiří Weiss.

Plot
It's very hot, putting a strain on everyone. A beautiful woman works in a shop in Czechoslovakia during the Communist era. She is in the late, disillusioned stages of an affair with a married man. Two government inspectors arrive to carry out an audit. The shop sells expensive alcoholic drinks. One inspector is relaxed, an old hand, but the other is a newcomer and meticulous. The heroine's boyfriend has stolen some bottles with her compliance. She manages to hide this from the meticulous inspector during the first day of the inspection. That night she and her boyfriend raise money and buy bottles to replace those he stole. That night also, we see the unhappy home life of the meticulous inspector - his alcoholic wife and lazy son. We are led to wonder if he has feelings for the heroine (the shop worker). On the second day of the inspection, the relaxed inspector of the pair drops a bottle and it breaks, leading to the discovery that almost all the bottles have had their contents stolen and are filled with tea. The film ends with an ambiguous act by the heroine, her motives unclear.

Cast
James Booth as Milan Vorel
Anne Heywood as Alena Burdová
Rudolf Hrušínský as JUDr. Rudolf Kurka
Ann Todd as Mrs. Kurková
Donald Wolfit as Bažant
Ladislav Potměšil as Jirka Kurka
Jiřina Jirásková as Věra
Vladimír Menšík as Emil, Věra's husband
Jiří Sovák as Director
Věra Tichánková as Marie Vávrová
Otakar Brousek as Milan Vorel (Czech voice)
Alena Kreuzmannová as Alena Burdová (Czech voice)
Zdenka Procházková as Mrs. Kurková (Czech voice)
Čestmír Řanda as Bažant (Czech voice)

Awards and nominations
Berlin International Film Festival
Won, "UNICRIT Award" - Jiří Weiss

Golden Globe Award
Nominated, "Best English-Language Foreign Film"

References

External links

The Digital Fix DVD review

1965 films
Czech drama films
Czechoslovak drama films
British drama films
English-language Czech films
Films directed by Jiří Weiss
1965 crime drama films
1960s crime thriller films
Czech black-and-white films
Czechoslovak black-and-white films
British black-and-white films
1960s English-language films
1960s British films
1960s Czech films